Dominic Anthony Marconi (born March 13, 1927) is an American prelate of the Roman Catholic Church. Marconi served as an auxiliary bishop of the Archdiocese of Newark in New Jersey from 1976 to 2002.

Biography
Dominic Marconi was born on March 13, 1927, Newark, New Jersey. He was ordained to the priesthood by Archbishop Thomas Boland for the Archdiocese of Newark on May 30, 1953.

During the 1970s, Marconi served as chaplain for St. Joseph’s School for the Blind in Jersey City, New Jersey. Marconi led the Vicariate of Union City, New Jersey, with 43 parishes and was director of the archdiocese's Division of Services to the Elderly.

Auxiliary Bishop of Newark 
On May 3, 1976, Pope Paul VI appointed Marconi as an auxiliary bishop of the Archdiocese of Newark and titular bishop of Bure. He was consecrated by Archbishop  Peter Gerety at the Cathedral Basilica of the Sacred Heart in Newark on June 25, 1976.

On July 1, 2002, Pope John Paul II accepted Marconi's letter of resignation as auxiliary bishop of Newark, submitted by Marconi when he reached the mandatory retirement of 75 for bishops.

References

External links
Roman Catholic Archdiocese of Newark Official Site

Clergy from Newark, New Jersey
20th-century American Roman Catholic titular bishops
1927 births
Living people